Matthias Witthaus (born 11 October 1982 in Oberhausen) is a field hockey player from Germany, who was a member of the Men's National Team that won the bronze medal at the 2004 Summer Olympics in Athens, Greece and the gold medal at the 2008 Summer Olympics in Beijing and again at the 2012 Summer Olympics.  He played a total of 335 caps for the national team from 1999 until 2012, with 335 caps he is the most capped German player of all time.

International Senior Tournaments
 1999 – European Nations Cup, Padua (1st place)
 2000 – Champions Trophy, Amstelveen (2nd place)
 2000 – Summer Olympics, Sydney (5th place)
 2001 – European Indoor Nations Cup, Luzern(1st place)
 2001 – Champions Trophy, Rotterdam (1st place)
 2002 – 10th World Cup, Kuala Lumpur (1st place)
 2002 – Champions Trophy, Cologne (2nd place)
 2003 – European Indoor Nations Cup, Santander (1st place)
 2003 – 1st World Indoor Cup, Leipzig (1st place)
 2003 – European Nations Cup, Barcelona (1st place)
 2004 – Summer Olympics, Athens (3rd place)
 2005 – European Nations Cup, Leipzig (3rd place)
 2005 – Champions Trophy, Chennai (4th place)
 2006 – Champions Trophy, Terrassa (2nd place)
 2006 – 11th World Cup, Mönchengladbach (1st place)
 2007 – European Nations Cup, Manchester (4th place)
 2007 – Champions Trophy, Kuala Lumpur (1st place)
 2008 – Summer Olympics, Beijing (1st place)
 2012 – Summer Olympics, London (1st place)

References

External links

1982 births
Living people
Sportspeople from Oberhausen
German male field hockey players
Male field hockey forwards
Olympic field hockey players of Germany
Olympic gold medalists for Germany
Olympic bronze medalists for Germany
Field hockey players at the 2000 Summer Olympics
2002 Men's Hockey World Cup players
Field hockey players at the 2004 Summer Olympics
2006 Men's Hockey World Cup players
Field hockey players at the 2008 Summer Olympics
2010 Men's Hockey World Cup players
Olympic medalists in field hockey
Field hockey players at the 2012 Summer Olympics
Medalists at the 2012 Summer Olympics
Medalists at the 2008 Summer Olympics
Medalists at the 2004 Summer Olympics
HTC Uhlenhorst Mülheim players
Real Club de Polo de Barcelona players
German expatriate sportspeople in Spain
Expatriate field hockey players
Atlètic Terrassa players
Mannheimer HC players
21st-century German people